The Super Bowl is the annual championship game of the National Football League (NFL), and is typically the highest-rated single television broadcast in the United States of any given year. As such, the television network that broadcasts the game will typically use it as a tent-pole for another program—airing following the conclusion of the game telecast—to take advantage of and retain the expanded audience.

The lead-out program is typically a highly anticipated special episode or a season premiere of an existing primetime program (such as a flagship drama, sitcom, or reality series), or in some cases, the premiere of a new series.

Overview

 

The Super Bowl provides an extremely strong lead-in to the programming on the channel following the game, the effects of which can last for several hours. For instance, in discussing the ratings of a local TV station, Buffalo, New York television critic Alan Pergament noted on the coattails from Super Bowl XLVII, which aired on CBS: "A paid program that ran on Channel 4 at 2:30 in the morning had a 1.3 rating. That's higher than some CW prime time shows get on WNLO-TV, Channel 4's sister station."

The Super Bowl lead-out is typically aired across most U.S. markets simultaneously, and is usually one hour in length, although before the game adopted its standard kickoff time of just after 6:00 p.m. ET in the early 1990s, it was not uncommon for longer programs to be broadcast. When the game moved into a later time slot in 1983, the game and its associated post-game programming would be scheduled until 10:00 p.m. Eastern Time / 7:00 p.m. Pacific Time, allowing for only one hour of network programming until the late local news. Outside of the few blowout games through the game's history, these programs never have started anywhere near the mentioned time, due to the extended length of the pre-game, halftime, and post-game festivities. Viewership for ABC's airing of Alias in 2003 after Super Bowl XXXVII was dampened by an unusually-long 40-minute post-game show (which featured a performance by Bon Jovi prior to the trophy presentation), which pushed the start time past 11:00 p.m. ET. Although a series high, the episode was one of the lowest-rated Super Bowl lead-outs.

It is common for affiliates in the home markets of the competing teams to delay the lead-out show further, until after additional local post-game coverage (though in 2018, despite the Philadelphia Eagles's win, NBC's Philadelphia station WCAU chose to carry post-game coverage to their Cozi TV subchannel instead in order to carry This Is Us as scheduled, to reduce viewer inconvenience).

In 1979, 1999, 2010, and 2017, and largely from the mid-1980s through the mid-1990s, this slot was used to showcase a new series or movie, such as The A-Team or The Wonder Years, or broadcast a special episode of an "up-and-coming" series. However, many of the series were ultimately unsuccessful, with some being canceled within a matter of weeks. Since then, virtually all of the programs in the post-game timeslot have been special episodes of series that had already aired for at least one season.

The most recent Super Bowl lead-out program to have also been a series premiere is The Equalizer, which followed CBS's broadcast of Super Bowl LV in 2021. A previous example, Undercover Boss (which was launched following Super Bowl XLIV on CBS) attracted the largest peak half-hour viewership of any Super Bowl lead-out program to date, with 75.474 million viewers. Four other series have had their season premieres following the Super Bowl: two editions of Survivor, the Australian and all-star series (which followed Super Bowls XXXV and XXXVIII), which aired on CBS, The Voice, which launched its second season following Super Bowl XLVI on NBC, and The Masked Singer, which launched its third season after Super Bowl LIV on Fox.

Although Fox almost never programs time slots after 10:00 p.m. except on Saturdays (instead encouraging its affiliates to air local news in the slot), Fox has aired lead-out programming after the Super Bowl ever since it began airing the game in 1997, which normally preempts local newscasts. The Fox affiliates in the market of the winning team sometimes air a post-Super Bowl newscast immediately following the game and delay the lead-out program until after the newscast's conclusion; two such examples included New York flagship O&O WNYW (after the New York Giants won Super Bowl XLII) and Boston affiliate WFXT (after the New England Patriots won Super Bowl LI).

Currently, a regular-length episode of a drama series will usually air, although in some cases a one-hour episode of a sitcom (normally 30 minutes in length), or two episodes of different sitcoms paired together, may air instead. Quite often the selected series is one of the "prestige" shows for the network showing the game that year, or a moderate hit (e.g. Friends and 3rd Rock From the Sun on NBC,The X-Files on Fox, Criminal Minds on CBS, or Grey's Anatomy on ABC), which the network wants to give a higher profile. The Simpsons has aired in the slot twice, with both airings being paired with the premieres of animated sitcoms (Family Guy in 1999, and American Dad! in 2005). An occasional practice used to maximize the effect of the lead-out is to make the Super Bowl episode a cliffhanger, with a story that concludes later in the week in the program's regularly scheduled timeslot, (3rd Rock From the Sun in 1998, Grey's Anatomy in 2006, and The Blacklist in 2015).

Rarely, and especially before the game moved to a 6:00 p.m. kickoff, the lead-out has been another sporting event, with the most recent case being Super Bowl LVI in 2022—which was followed by coverage of the 2022 Winter Olympics in Beijing, China. Previously, the last Super Bowl to have a sporting event as a lead-out was  Super Bowl X in 1976—which was followed by final round coverage of the Phoenix Open golf tournament.

It has also been rare for a Super Bowl leadout program to be a made-for-TV movie, as was the case of Raid on Entebbe following Super Bowl XI and Brotherhood of the Rose following Super Bowl XXIII.

Because the Super Bowl is on a Sunday, before the mid-2000s, networks never carried a new episode of their weeknight late night talk shows after the game, lead-out program and local news. However this has changed since then, usually after the late local news, in order to give those programs an additional promotional push to introduce the current generation of hosts (who have been more willing to promote their series on more than a traditional Monday-to-Friday schedule, and have had a wider audience via internet video than their predecessors). This was first done with the live premiere episode of Jimmy Kimmel Live after Super Bowl XXXVII in 2003, followed by The Late Late Show with Craig Ferguson after Super Bowl XLI in 2007. Late Night with Jimmy Fallon was next to follow in 2012 after Super Bowl XLVI, finishing a week of shows recorded from Indianapolis. Ferguson aired a special episode from New Orleans after Super Bowl XLVII in 2013. In 2015, Jimmy Fallon had another new episode after Super Bowl XLIX from Phoenix, this time as the host of The Tonight Show. In 2016 for Super Bowl 50, CBS aired a special live episode of The Late Show with Stephen Colbert as its lead-out, rather than a primetime series episode. The Late Late Show with James Corden also aired a special edition after local newscasts. Fallon then hosted another episode after Super Bowl LII in Minneapolis. Colbert followed suit in 2019 and 2021.

The most common lead-out program is the news magazine 60 Minutes, which has aired after four Super Bowls (VI, XIV, XVI, XXVI). Lassie was the lead-out show three times (I, II, IV) and three series have appeared in the time slot twice—The Wonderful World of Disney (I, VII).The Simpsons (XXXIII, XXXIX) and Survivor (XXXV, XXXVIII)

List of lead-out programs
The following is a list of shows that have aired after the Super Bowl in the United States:

Lead-outs in Canada

The Canadian broadcast rightsholder to the Super Bowl which airs the game in simulcast with the U.S. broadcaster – CTV since 2008 – airs its own specific lead-out programs for Canadian audiences, as the Canadian network does not necessarily own domestic rights to the program airing as the lead-out of the U.S. broadcaster. For example, after Super Bowl XLV, CTV aired the season finale of its original drama Flashpoint, as Glee rights were held by Global. Global counter-programmed the game with a "Sue-Per Bowl Sunday" marathon of Glee encores, and Glee-themed episodes of The Simpsons ("Elementary School Musical") and The Office to lead into its simulcast of the new episode, "The Sue Sylvester Shuffle". Citytv similarly acquired rights to the Super Bowl LIII lead-out The World's Best. Super Bowls XLVI, LII, and LIV provided exceptions, as CTV is the Canadian rightsholder of The Voice, This Is Us, and The Masked Singer.

CTV was to air a "sneak peek" of the second season of its original sitcom Spun Out after Super Bowl XLIX, but the premiere was pulled after cast member J. P. Manoux was charged with voyeurism. The season 2 premiere of MasterChef Canada was pushed ahead to air in its place.

Programs marked in bold were aired in simulcast with the U.S. Super Bowl lead-out.

Footnotes

References

External links
 The Winners and Losers of Post-Super Bowl TV

Lead-out programs
Lead-out programs
Super Bowl
History of National Football League broadcasting